Sturdies Bay is on the south east part of Galiano Island in British Columbia, Canada's Gulf Islands. It is known primarily for its ferry terminal, that connects it to the Tsawwassen Ferry Terminal and the other southern Gulf Islands.  At the ferry terminal there is also a public dock, serviced in the summer on Saturday by an inter-island water taxi. There is a small settlement at Sturdies Bay consisting of several businesses, including four restaurants, a food truck, two stores, a post office/tea store, a gas station/grocery   store, and an inn.

There are also a few private residences and moorings.

On some nautical maps it is listed as "Port of Sturdee."

References

Unincorporated settlements in British Columbia
Populated places in the Capital Regional District
Galiano Island